North Central Historic District can refer to:
 North Central Historic District (Alexandria City, Alabama), listed on the NRHP in Alabama
North Central Avenue Streetscape Historic District, Phoenix, AZ, listed on the NRHP in Arizona
 North Central Historic District (Baltimore, Maryland), listed on the NRHP in Maryland